Beerbaum is a surname. Notable people with the surname include:

 Ludger Beerbaum (born 1963), German equestrian 
 Meredith Michaels-Beerbaum (born 1969), American-German equestrian